The Kyiv Half Marathon is an annual road running event over the half marathon distance which is held in April on the streets of Kyiv, Ukraine since 2011. In 2015 Kyiv half marathon became a full member of the AIMS. It carries World Athletics Silver Label Road Race status.

History

In 2018, the participants were traditionally offered to choose one of the individual courses of the event: 21.0975 km, 5 km and 2 km. Besides the individual races, the 8th Kyiv Half Marathon included relay races (1х10 km + 1х11 km HeForShe Kyiv Half Marathon Relay and 3х5 km + 1х6 km Under Armour Relay) and corporate races (Chamber Cup, Diplomat Cup, Security Cup). The organizers welcomed almost 1000 children of various ages in children's races: 1000 m, 500 m, and 100 m. The number of participants reached 11000 people (3595 participated in the half marathon race) from 52 countries.

Additionally, the 8th Kyiv Half Marathon became the first running event in Ukraine to receive the Bronze Label from the world organization IAAF.

The 2020 in-person edition of the race was canceled due to the coronavirus pandemic, with all registrants given the option of transferring their entry to 2021 or 2022, or receiving credit of equivalent value for other races.

On , a week after Russia invaded Ukraine with help from Belarus, Run Ukraine banned Russian and Belarusian runners from all its events, and stated that the runners' registration fees would be used to restore Ukraine.

Course 

The route of the race runs across Kyiv city uniting two banks of the Dnipro river. Track surface: 97% – blacktop, 3% – paving. Total elevation gain – 172 meters. The start and finish lines of all courses are located in the same spot on Square of Contracts.

Winners 
Key: Course record

Notes

References

External links 
 

Half marathons
Sports competitions in Kyiv
Recurring sporting events established in 2011
Athletics competitions in Ukraine
2011 establishments in Ukraine
Athletics in Kyiv